(Aino-Island) is an island in Shingū, Fukuoka, Japan.  Many feral cats and strays live on this island. Hence, it is known as "Cat Heaven Island".

Sightseeing spots
Ainoshima has some historic sites.

Tumuli 
These piles of stone from the 5th century are located on the eastern side of the island. They are speculated to mark ancient graves.

Transportation

Shingū Port (Shingū Fishing Port) - Ainoshima Port : Required time and fare: approx.17 minutes, 480 JPY
Shingū Port is a twenty-minute walk from Nishitetsu Shingū Station.

See also 
 Aoshima, Ehime

References

Islands of Fukuoka Prefecture
Feral cats